A number of guitarists have used guitar/synthesizers, which are musical instruments which allow a guitar player to play synthesizers. Many guitar/synth performers are either jazz, progressive rock, metal or fusion guitarists, including:

 John Abercrombie
 Jan Akkerman
 Jeff Baxter
 Adrian Belew
 Matt Bellamy
 Ritchie Blackmore 
 Dave Brock 
 Dean Brown 
 Bugo  
 David Byrne
 Eric Clapton
 J.J. Cale
 Bootsy Collins (bass guitar) 
 Amir Derakh
 Al Di Meola
 K. K. Downing
 Les Fradkin
 Peter Frampton 
 Russ Freeman
 Robert Fripp
 Susumu Hirasawa
 Bill Frisell
 Reeves Gabrels
 Jerry Garcia
 Chris Gavin
 David Gilmour
 Jason Gobel

 Steve Hackett 
 Chuck Hammer
 Steve Harris (bass guitar)
 Bob Hartman
 Steve Hillage
 Allan Holdsworth
 Brian Hughes
 Ryo Kawasaki
 Phil Keaggy
 Maynard James Keenan
 Közi
 Shawn Lane
 Alex Lifeson
 Liam Lynch
 Mana
 Paul Masvidal
 Bret McKenzie 
 John McLaughlin
 Justin McNeil
 Tony McPhee
 Pat Metheny
 Joni Mitchell
 Steve Morse
 Dave Murray

 Bill Nelson
 Mike Oldfield
 Jimmy Page
 Prince
 Vernon Reid
 Sheldon Reynolds
 Lee Ritenour
 Omar Rodríguez-López
 Jordan Rudess
 Mike Rutherford
 Karl Sanders
 Neal Schon
 Marc Schonbrun
 Adrian Smith
 Andy Summers
 Mike Stern
 Rob Swire
 Ronni Le Tekrø
 Glenn Tipton
 Roger Troutman

External links
 General MIDI guitar information

Synthesizer